Jeannette Goergen-Philip (born 30 November 1947) is a Luxembourgian archer. She was born in Echternach.

She competed at the 1984 Summer Olympics in Los Angeles, and at the 1992 Summer Olympics in Barcelona.

References

1947 births
Living people
People from Echternach
Luxembourgian female archers
Olympic archers of Luxembourg
Archers at the 1984 Summer Olympics
Archers at the 1992 Summer Olympics